Kaizuka Station is the name of two train stations in Japan:

 Kaizuka Station (Fukuoka)
 Kaizuka Station (Osaka)